No. 89757 is the third studio album by Singaporean singer JJ Lin, released on 1 April 2005 by Ocean Butterflies.

Track listing
 "一千年以前" (A Thousand Years Ago)
 "木乃伊" (The Mummy) 
 "編號89757" (No. 89757)
 "莎士比亞的天份" (Shakespeare's Talent)
 "突然累了" (Down Lately)
 "明天" (Tomorrow)
 "簡簡單單" (Simple)
 "無盡的思念" (I Miss You)
 "盜" (Plagiarizing)
 "聽不懂沒關係" (It's OK if You Don't Understand)
 "來不及了" (We're Out of Time)
 "一千年以後" (A Thousand Years Later)
 "被风吹过的夏天" (Summer Breeze) feat. Kym

References

2005 albums
JJ Lin albums